Cowboy Counsellor is a 1932 American Pre-Code Western film starring Hoot Gibson and directed by George Melford. It mixed in strong elements of comedy with courtroom drama. One reviewer deemed it "the best of Gibson's films for Allied."

Plot
Dan Alton is a con artist, posing as a lawyer in order to sell copies of a phony law book. When Bill Clary robs a stagecoach, and plants some of the stolen money at the ranch of Luke Avery, Avery's sister beautiful sister Ruth ropes an instantly smitten Alton into being Avery's defense attorney. As part of his strategy to defend Avery, Alton plans to pull off another stagecoach robbery.

Cast
Hoot Gibson as Dan Alton
Sheila Bromley as Ruth Avery
Jack Rutherford as Bill Clary
Skeeter Bill Robbins as Deputy Lafe Walters
Al Bridge as Sheriff Matt Farraday
Fred Gilman as Luke Avery
Bobby Nelson as Bobby Avery
William Humphrey as Judge Kendell
Gordon De Main as Replaced by Lorch
Merrill McCormick as Bearded Prisoner
Sam Allen as Hotel Clerk

References

External links

1932 Western (genre) films
American Western (genre) films
American black-and-white films
1930s English-language films
Films about con artists
Films directed by George Melford
1930s American films